Stanground Wash is a 26 hectare nature reserve in Stanground, a suburb of Peterborough in Cambridgeshire. It is managed by the Wildlife Trust for Bedfordshire, Cambridgeshire and Northamptonshire.

The site is sandwiched between the railway, Ely-Peterborough line and Back River, a tributary of the River Nene. It is grassland which is flooded in winter, providing a refuge for waterbirds, and is grazed in the summer. It has a variety of birds such as snipe, redshanks and sandpipers, and ditches with rare beetles.

There is access by a footpath from North Street along the south bank of the river to a footbridge, but there is a locked gate 100 yards before the bridge.

References

See also
Stanground Newt Ponds

Wildlife Trust for Bedfordshire, Cambridgeshire and Northamptonshire reserves
Geography of Peterborough